The Department of the Air Force Rapid Capabilities Office (RCO or DAF RCO) is an office in the United States Department of the Air Force tasked with expediting the development of select technological systems. The RCO was activated by the secretary of the Air Force on April 28, 2003, and is currently overseeing the development of the U.S. Air Force's Northrop Grumman B-21 Raider in partnership with Northrop Grumman, and the U.S. Space Force's X-37B Orbital Test Vehicle in partnership with NASA.

References

External links
Air Force Rapid Capabilities Office fact sheet

United States Air Force organization
Military technology